Diarylide pigments are organic compounds that are used as pigments in inks and related materials.  They often are yellow or yellow-green.  To some extent, these organic compounds have displaced cadmium sulfide from the market.  They exist as yellow powders of low solubility in water.

Production 

The formation of these pigments involves the reaction of diazotized aromatic diamines (derivatives of benzidine) with coupling components, typically derivatives of acetoacetanilide.  By varying both of these components, a wide variety of pigments have been produced. A related family of organic pigments are the simpler arylides, which arise from the coupling of monodiazonium salts with the same coupling partners.

The molecular structures of these molecules is more conjugated than represented in the images shown below. The pigments' colors can range from yellow to green. One of the most common diarylide yellow pigments is Pigment Yellow 12. Other diarylide yellow pigments include ‘’’yellow 13’’’  , ‘’’yellow 17’’’  and yellow 83  . These pigments share the same backbone and vary in color depending on substitution of the benzene rings. Worldwide production of color organic pigments was estimated to be about 250,000 metric tons (t) in 2006, with about 25%, or 62,500 t, being diarylide yellows.

Uses 
The diarylide yellows are the most common yellow pigments used in printing as well as a wide variety of other applications.  Due to their stability, diarylide yellows are used in inks, coatings, and as plastic colorants.  The pigment is insoluble. It is a standard pigment used in printing ink and packaging industry.  The diarylide yellow pigment Yellow 12 is one of the three main colored pigments used in the four color process of color printing.  As such, its use is ubiquitous in printing both in commercial applications and in home color printers, as well as in textile printing.

Toxicity and hazards 
Diarylide yellow pigments are considered to be non-toxic. There is, however, evidence that these pigments degrade when exposed to temperatures above 200 °C to release 3,3'-dichlorobenzidine, a carcinogen that is listed in the U.S. EPA’s Toxics Release Inventory.  3,3’-Dichlorobenzidine is structurally similar to one of the polychlorinated biphenyl congeners, PCB 11 (3,3’-dichlorobiphenyl), and some evidence indicates that the use of diarylide yellow pigments introduces PCB 11 to the environment.

See also 
 List of colours

References 

Pigments
Organic pigments
Shades of yellow
Diarylide pigments